Israel competed in the Winter Olympic Games for the first time at the 1994 Winter Olympics in Lillehammer, Norway.

The lone Israeli competitor was Michael Shmerkin in men's figure skating.

Competitors
The following is the list of number of competitors in the Games.

Results by event

Figure skating

References

Nations at the 1994 Winter Olympics
1994 Winter Olympics
Winter Olympics